Rivière-Bonjour is an unorganized territory in the Bas-Saint-Laurent region of Quebec, Canada. A large part of the territory is part of the Matane Wildlife Reserve.

The stream joins the Matane River at Matane Lake.

Demographics

Population

See also
 List of unorganized territories in Quebec

References

Unorganized territories in Bas-Saint-Laurent